The Minas Gerais state football team represents Minas Gerais in association football.

Players

Following is the information about the players who appeared for the Minas Gerais state team:

Notable players

 
 Belletti
 Dadá Maravilha
 Danival
 Dirceu Lopes
 Éder Luís
 Lincoln
 Nelinho
 Piazza
 Raul Plassmann
 Reinaldo
 Tostão

Managers

These are all the managers who as headed Minas Gerais state team:

 
  Darío Pereyra (1999)
 Ney Franco (2006)

Honours

Campeonato Brasileiro de Seleções Estaduais:
Winners: 1962

Troféu Prefeito Souza Lima: (vs. Brazil)
Winners: 1969

Taça Gastão Soares de Moura: (vs. Rio de Janeiro)
Winners: 1975

Fixtures and results

21st century

The Minas Gerais state team played only one match in the XXI century:

Last squad 

The following players were called up for the friendly match against Cruzeiro, on April 8, 2006.

Head-to-head record

Below is a result summary of all matches Minas Gerais have played against another Brazilian state teams, FIFA national teams and clubs.

State teams (non-FIFA)

National teams (FIFA)

References

 
Minas Gerais